The 1944 Kirkcaldy Burghs by-election was held on 17 February 1944.  The by-election was held due to the resignation  of the incumbent Labour MP, Tom Kennedy.  It was won by the Labour candidate Thomas Hubbard, but Douglas Young of the Scottish National Party came a close second.

References

1944 elections in the United Kingdom
1944 in Scotland
1940s elections in Scotland
20th century in Fife
Politics of Fife
Kirkcaldy
By-elections to the Parliament of the United Kingdom in Scottish constituencies